A kneaded eraser, also commonly known as a putty rubber, is a pliable erasing tool used by artists. It is usually made of a grey or white unvulcanized rubber (though it can be found in many different colors, such as green, blue, hot pink, yellow, and so forth) resembling putty or chewing gum. It functions by absorbing and "picking up" graphite and charcoal particles, in addition to carbon, colored pencil, or pastel marks. It neither wears nor leaves residue ("eraser crumbs"), thereby lasting much longer than other erasers. 

Kneaded erasers have great plasticity and can be stretched, compressed, split, and molded for precision erasing, pruning lines, cleaning edges, creating highlights through subtractive drawing, or performing other detail work. They can completely remove light marks, but are ill-suited to fully erasing dark areas. They may also smear or stick if too warm.

Besides their precision, kneaded erasers are preferred by artists for their long life and ease of cleaning. One simply kneads their eraser and the medium will fade into its mass. Although kneaded erasers do not wear away like other erasers, they can become saturated and unable to absorb any more graphite or charcoal. In this case, the eraser will leave marks on the paper instead of removing them. The saturating material can be removed by rinsing and kneading.

They can also be useful as a material for impromptu sculptures, similar to plasticine, for sketching or fun.

References

Visual arts materials
Drawing